Randall Donn Marshall (born December 14, 1946) was an American football defensive end. 

Marshall was born in Oregon City, Oregon, in 1946 and attended Santiam High School in Mill City, Oregon. He played college football and basketball at Linfield College in McMinnville, Oregon, and was selected by the Atlanta Falcons in the sixth round (152nd overall pick) of the 1970 NFL Draft. He appeared in 15 games for the Falcons, two of them as a starter, during the 1970 and 1971 seasons.

References

1946 births
Living people
American football defensive ends
Linfield Wildcats football players
Atlanta Falcons players
Players of American football from Oregon
People from Oregon City, Oregon